Protesilaus macrosilaus is a species of butterfly of the genus Protesilaus. It is found in Mexico and from Guatemala to Nicaragua and in Colombia.

Subspecies
Protesilaus macrosilaus macrosilaus (Guatemala to Nicaragua)
Protesilaus macrosilaus leucones (Rothschild & Jordan, 1906) (Colombia)
Protesilaus macrosilaus penthesilaus (C. & R. Felder, 1865) (Mexico)

References
 

Lewis, H. L., 1974 Butterflies of the World  Page 23, figure 14.

External links

 
BOA Images of types

Butterflies described in 1853
Papilionidae